The Haifa International Film Festival is an annual film festival that takes place every autumn (between late September and late October), during the week-long holiday of Sukkot, in Haifa, Israel.

History
The festival was inaugurated in 1983 and was the first of its kind in Israel. Over the years, it has become the country's major cinematic event.

The Haifa International Film Festival attracts a wide audience of film-goers and media professionals from Israel and abroad. Throughout the week, special screenings are held of c.170 new films. Apart from movies screened around the clock at seven theaters, the festival features open-air screenings. Film categories include feature films, documentaries, animation, short films, retrospectives and tributes.

The Board of Directors is composed of film and culture professionals and public figures. The festival is underwritten by the City of Haifa, the Ministry of Education, the Israeli Film Council, and the European Union, as well as commercial companies.

See also
Culture of Israel
Cinema of Israel

References

External links
Haifa International Film Festival official website

1983 establishments in Israel
Film festivals established in 1983
Film festivals in Israel
International Film Festival
Tourist attractions in Haifa
Sukkot